Charles Strasburger is an American former college men's basketball head coach. He coached Lipscomb University for the 1973–74 and 1974–75 seasons, compiling an overall record of 26 wins and 34 losses. In neither season did the Bisons make an NAIA Tournament appearance. Strasburger also later coached high school basketball.

Head coaching record

References

Living people
American men's basketball coaches
High school basketball coaches in the United States
Lipscomb Bisons men's basketball coaches
Year of birth missing (living people)